American band No Doubt has recorded over 100 songs for six studio albums, various compilations and soundtracks, and has been featured on songs on other artists' albums. After forming in 1986, the band released a series of demo tapes at their concerts and live shows. Several of the songs on these tapes ("Ache", "Let's Get Back", "Move On", "Paulina", and "Sometimes") later appeared on their 1992 debut album, No Doubt. In response to the commercial disappointment of their debut and being dropped from Interscope Records, the group produced The Beacon Street Collection (1995) by themselves. The album took influence from punk music, which differentiated it from the new wave and synth influences of their debut. Their third studio album, Tragic Kingdom (1995), incorporated punk, pop, and ska; the album spawned seven singles, including the commercially successful hits "Just a Girl", "Spiderwebs", and "Don't Speak". The majority of the album's songs were written by Gwen Stefani, whereas her brother Eric Stefani had written the bulk of No Doubt and The Beacon Street Collection. Tragic Kingdom has sold 16 million copies worldwide as of 2015, and is one of the best-selling albums of all time in the United States. In 2000, No Doubt released their fourth studio album, Return of Saturn. Four singles were released: "New", "Ex-Girlfriend", "Simple Kind of Life", and "Bathwater". Lyrically, the songs featured on Return of Saturn are complex and have Stefani singing about her personal romances.

No Doubt's fifth album – Rock Steady (2001) – features contributions from a wide variety of high-profile musicians, including William Orbit, Prince, David Stewart, and Pharrell Williams. It features "mainstream pop" and reggae music and was released following the commercial success of two of Gwen Stefani's solo singles: "South Side" (2000) and "Let Me Blow Ya Mind" (2001). In 2003, the group's first compilation album The Singles 1992–2003 was released and included a cover of "It's My Life", originally recorded by Talk Talk. After 2004, the group took a brief hiatus before reuniting in 2009 for work on a new album. Push and Shove (2012) serves as No Doubt's comeback record and spawned two singles ("Settle Down" and "Looking Hot") and two promotional singles ("Stand and Deliver" and "Push and Shove"). They also collaborated with Jamaican rapper Busy Signal and American trio Major Lazer for the title track. Push and Shove explores more modern sounds and expands on their exploration with dancehall and reggae music. The group also has writing credits on several other albums. They collaborated with Elvis Costello on "I Throw My Toys Around" for the soundtrack to The Rugrats Movie (1998) and recorded a cover of Donna Summer's "Love to Love You Baby" for the 2001 soundtrack to Zoolander.

Songs 
All songs recorded by No Doubt, except where noted. This is not a complete list.

References

External links 
No Doubt songs at AllMusic

No Doubt